Thomas McNeil may refer to:

 Thomas H. McNeil (1860–1932), American football player and lawyer
 Tom McNeil (1929–2020), Australian rules footballer and politician